Lysidine is an uncommon nucleoside, rarely seen outside of tRNA. It is a derivative of cytidine in which the carbonyl is replaced by the amino acid lysine. The third position in the anti-codon of the Isoleucine-specific tRNA, is typically changed from a cytidine which would pair with guanosine to a lysidine which will base pair with adenosine. Uridine could not be used at this position even though it is a conventional partner for adenosine since it will also "wobble base pair" with guanosine.  So lysidine allows better translation fidelity. Lysidine is denoted as L or k2C (lysine bound to C2 atom of cytidine).

References 

Nucleosides
Pyrimidines
Hydroxymethyl compounds